The Wilson-Pittman-Campbell-Gregory House is a historic house at 405 East Dickson Street in Fayetteville, Arkansas.  It is a two-story brick structure, with a late 19th-century two-story kitchen addition to the rear, and a modern single-story ell.  Its current west-facing front dates stylistically to the 1870s, with Italianate brackets, engaged posts, and balustrade, but is a 1930s reconstruction of the original.  Prominent local owners of the building include James Pittman, a Civil War colonel, Benjamin F. Campbell, a businessman, and James Gregory, a local politician.

The house was listed on the National Register of Historic Places in 1980.

See also
National Register of Historic Places listings in Washington County, Arkansas

References

Houses on the National Register of Historic Places in Arkansas
Italianate architecture in Arkansas
Houses completed in 1866
Houses in Fayetteville, Arkansas
1866 establishments in Arkansas
National Register of Historic Places in Fayetteville, Arkansas